Camille Le Tallec has preserved and created in its studio more than 375 Limoges porcelain decorative patterns signed by the Le Tallec's marks. There were realized in the French technical tradition of the 18th and 19th centuries, developed for the Sèvres porcelain. From 1961, some of the Le Tallec's patterns were especially created for Tiffany & Co and by 1990 when the studio was acquired by the jewelry and silverware company an extensive new creation process had then been engaged.

The list of the 100 most popular patterns amongst others:
 Abeilles Or (Golden bees)
 Alice
 Angoulême
 Attributs de Musique (Music attributes)
 Automne boisé (Wooded Fall)
 Bacchus
 Bagatelle
 Bande Corail sur Bleuets (Coral Stripes on Cornflower)
 Baron Jourdan
 Bayeux
 Bigouden
 Black Shoulder 
 Bleu Celeste (Heavenly blue)
 Bourgogne (Burgundy)
 Carousel Chinois  (Chinese Carousel)
 Cartes (Playing cards)
 Chantilly
 Charmille
 Chinoiseries sur Or (Chinoiseries on Gold)
 Cirque Chinois (Chinese circus)
 Clairette
 Clowns
 Cœurs Fleuris (Flowered Hearts)
 Corail Chinois (Chinese coral)
 Coral with Medallion Flower
 Croisillon et Fleurs (Braces and Flowers)
 Crépuscule des Dieux (Dawnfall of the Gods)
 Dentelle (Lace)
 Dentelle Fleurie (Flowered Lace)
 Directoire
 Escalier de Cristal (Crystal Stairs)
 Famille Rose (Rose's family)
 Feathers
 Feuilles de Chêne (Oak's Leaves)
 Fleur de Lys
 Fleurs sur Fond Gris (Fleur de Lys on grey background)
 Fleurs sur Fond Noir (Fleur de Lys on black background)
 Grignan
 Grisé à la Manière de Boucher
 Guerre et Paix et Batailles de Napoléon (War and Peace and Napoleon's Battles)
 Guirlande de Fleurs (Garland)
 Halcyon
 Harvest
 Incrustés Or (Golden Inlays)
 Imari
 Jardin (Garden) 
 Jardin de Chine (Gardens of China)
 Joséphine
 Kimono
 Laque de Chine (Lacquers of China)
 Losanges en Or (Golden Diamonds)
 Lubéron
 Lulu
 Madame du Barry
 Marie Antoinette
 Marin en Relief d'Or sur Blanc (Marin in gold relief on White)
 Marin sur Jaune (Marin on Yellow)
 Marseille
 Mauresque
 Médaillon de Fleurs
 Médaillon de Sèvres
 Mennecy
 Myosotis Bleu (Blue Forget-me-not)
 Napoléon III
 Nuits de Chine (Nights of China)
 Ondine
 Oiseaux (Birds)
 Oiseaux de Paradis (Birds-of-paradise)
 Oiseaux de Sèvres sur Or (Birds on golden Sèvres)
 Or et Platine (Gold and Platinum)
 Palmier d'Or (Golden Palm-trees)
 Panache
 Pastorale
 Petits Metiers de Paris (Paris' art craft)
 Plumes (Feathers)
 Poisson de Chine (Chinese fish)
 Polka
 Princesse Astride
 Rochas
 Ronde de Cygnes (Round dance of Swans)
 Ronsard
 Ruban Rose (Rose Ribbon)
 Rue de la Paix
 Siam
 Soleil (Sun)
 Taj Mahal
 Treille Muscate (Vine Arbour)
 Tulipes sur Or (Tulips on Gold)
 Tulipes Royales (Royal Tulips)
 Valse (Waltz)
 Viaduc des Arts (Viaduct of Arts)
 Vignes Rouges (Red Vines)
 William IV

In addition, Camille Le Tallec has also interacted with modern artists, which occurred to be friends, especially after the WWII to create original and limited series of patterns. Among them may be cited :
 Danseurs espagnols designed in 1949 by Jean Toth, for the Opéra Garnier.
 Danses africaines designed in 1950 by Jean Toth for Marin's connoisseur shop in Paris.
 Ballet, designed in 1949 by Jean Target for the Opéra Garnier depicting dancers Paulette Dynalix, Tamara Toumanova and Yvette Chauviré.
 Ladies designed in 1945 by Louis Touchagues.
 Poissons designed in 1945 by Louis Touchagues.
 Combats de Coqs designed by Lucien Louvegnies.

References

Bibliography
 Keith and Thomas Waterbrook-Clyde, Atelier Le Tallec Hand Painting Limoges Porcelain, Schiffer Publishing, 2003

External links
 Le Tallec for Tiffany & Co

Porcelain of France